Carolina López-Ruiz is a Spanish classicist specializing in comparative mythology, Ancient Mediterranean religions, Greek language and literature, North-West Semitic languages and literatures, and cultural exchange. She has authored several works on the Phoenician civilization, and contacts between Greek and Near Eastern cultures.

López-Ruiz received her BA and MA in classical philology from the Autonomous University of Madrid in 1995, attended the Hebrew University of Jerusalem from 1995 to 1996, and completed her PhD at the University of Chicago between 1996 and 2005.

Since 2005, López-Ruiz has been a professor in the Department of Classics and the Ohio State University.

Selected publications

References 

Living people
Women classical scholars
Phoenician-Punic studies
Ohio State University faculty
Year of birth missing (living people)